Hoosier Township  is a township in Kingman County, Kansas, USA.  As of the 2000 census, its population was 162.

Geography
Hoosier Township covers an area of 36.12 square miles (93.55 square kilometers); of this, 0.01 square miles (0.02 square kilometers) or 0.02 percent is water.

Adjacent townships
 Loda Township, Reno County (north)
 Roscoe Township, Reno County (northeast)
 White Township (east)
 Ninnescah Township (south and southeast)
 Union Township (southwest)
 Eureka Township (west)
 Bell Township, Reno County (northwest)

Cemeteries
The township contains one cemetery, Hoosier.

Major highways
 U.S. Route 54
 K-14 (Kansas highway)

References
 U.S. Board on Geographic Names (GNIS)
 United States Census Bureau cartographic boundary files

External links
 US-Counties.com
 City-Data.com

Townships in Kingman County, Kansas
Townships in Kansas